The Journey of Karma is a 2018 Hindi film starring Poonam Pandey and Shakti Kapoor directed by Jagbir Dahiya and written by Rupesh Paul. The Journey of Karma was released on 26 October 2018.

Premise 
It is a story of a slum girl who is good in studies and tries to chase her dreams to works at US. She travels through her journey packed with twist'n turns, surprises & lust with a mysterious old man.

Cast 

 Poonam Pandey as Karma D'souza
 Shakti Kapoor as Mahek D. Shukla
 Shravani
 Shivender Dahiya
 Kressy Singh as Karma D'souza's Friend

Soundtrack 

The music of the film is composed by Danish Alfaaz, Nishant Salil and Onkar Minhas.

References

External links
 
 

2018 films
2010s Hindi-language films
Indian erotic drama films